Daviesia lineata is a species of flowering plant in the family Fabaceae and is endemic to the south-west of Western Australia. It is an erect, bushy shrub with scattered needle-shaped, sharply-pointed phyllodes and yellow and reddish flowers.

Description

Taxonomy and naming
Daviesia lineata was first formally described in 1995 by Michael Crisp in Australian Systematic Botany from specimens collected near Newdegate on the road to Lake King in 1984. The specific epithet (lineata) means "marked with straight lines", referring to the phyllodes.

Distribution and habitat
This daviesia grows in kwongan in areas largely cleared for agriculture in the Newdegate – Lake King area in the Mallee biogeographic region of south-western Western Australia.

Conservation status
Daviesia lineata is listed as "Priority Two" by the Western Australian Government Department of Biodiversity, Conservation and Attractions, meaning that it is poorly known and from only one or a few locations.

References

lineata
Eudicots of Western Australia
Plants described in 1995
Taxa named by Michael Crisp